Netherlands Association of Film Distributors is an association for film distributors in the Netherlands, based in Amsterdam. Sixteen film distributors in the Netherlands are member organizations. Weekly, the association publishes information about new film releases and box office results in the Netherlands. The box office awards Crystal Film, Golden Film, and Platinum Film are based on this information.

References

External links
Nederlandse Vereniging van Filmdistributeurs 

Trade associations based in the Netherlands